"Look Back Again"/"Over the Distance" is a song by Hitomi Yaida, released as a double A-side single. It was the second single taken from the album Candlize.

"Look Back Again" reached 5th place in the charts with "Over the Distance" not performing as well and reaching 13th position.

"Over the Distance" was featured in the Nintendo DS Rhythm game Osu! Tatakae! Ouendan, as one of the most subdued songs in the game due to its use of soft bells and chimes replacing the high-pitched whistling used for most of the game's songs. The stage involves helping a recently deceased young man deliver a final message to his lover.

Track listing

Notes

2001 singles
Hitomi Yaida songs
2001 songs
Songs written by Hitomi Yaida